Tumbo is a locality situated in Eskilstuna Municipality, Södermanland County, Sweden with 292 inhabitants in 2010.

See also
 Södermanland Runic Inscription 84

References 

Populated places in Södermanland County
Populated places in Eskilstuna Municipality